Fumigaclavine A is an antibacterial ergoline alkaloid produced by endophytic Aspergillus.

Both 8α and 8β diastereomers (epimers) were named fumigaclavine A in scientific literature.

See also
 Fumigaclavine B
 Fumigaclavine C
 Fumigaclavine A dimethylallyltransferase

References

Ergolines
Acetate esters